A  ('migrant word', plural ; capitalized like all German nouns) is a word that has spread as a loanword among numerous languages and cultures, especially those that are far away from one another, usually in connection with trade. As such,  are a curiosity in historical linguistics and sociolinguistics within a wider study of language contact. At a sufficient time depth, it can be very difficult to establish in which language or language family it originated and in which it was borrowed.

Examples 

Tea, with its maritime variant tea and Eurasian continental variant chai (both variants have entered English), is an example whose spread occurred relatively late in human history and is therefore fairly well understood: tea is from Hokkien, specifically Amoy, from the Fujianese port of Xiamen, hence maritime, while cha (whence chai) is used in Cantonese and Mandarin. See etymology of tea for further details.

Farang, a term derived from the ethnonym Frank through Arabic and Persian, refers to (typically white, European) foreigners. From the above two languages, the word has been loaned into many languages spoken on or near the Indian Ocean, including Hindi, Thai, and Amharic, among others.

Another example is orange, which originated in a Dravidian language (likely Tamil, Telugu or Malayalam), and whose likely path to English included, in order, Sanskrit, Persian, possibly Armenian, Arabic, Late Latin, Italian, and Old French. 

Another example is the word arslan ("lion") of Turkic origin, whose variants are now widely distributed from Hungarian, Manchu to Persian, although they merely serve as personal names in some languages. It also inspired the name Aslan in the English novel series The Chronicles of Narnia.

The word for "horse" across many Eurasian languages seem to be related such as Mongolian морь (mor'''), Manchu ᠮᠣᡵᡳᠨ (morin), Korean 말 (mal), Japanese 馬 (uma), and Thai ม้า (máː), as well as Sino-Tibetan languages leading to Mandarin 馬 (mǎ), and Tibetan རྨང (rmang). It is present in several Indo-European languages as well but limited only to the Celtic and Germanic branches whence Irish marc or English mare.''

References

Etymology
Words
Historical linguistics
German words and phrases
Language geography